Tiago Emanuel Canelas Almeida Ferreira  (born 10 July 1993) is a Portuguese professional footballer who plays for Trofense as a central defender.

Club career

Porto
Born in Porto, Ferreira played youth football with five clubs in the area, finishing his development with FC Porto after joining at the age of 14. He made his professional debut with the reserves that competed in the second division, his first appearance in the competition being on 12 August 2012 in a 2–2 away draw against C.D. Tondela.

Ferreira played 35 matches and scored one goal in the 2013–14 season to help his team to a final runner-up position in the second tier, but they were ineligible for promotion. In summer 2014, after failing to appear once in competitive games for the main squad, he was released.

Zulte Waregem
On 15 July 2014, free agent Ferreira signed a four-year contract with S.V. Zulte Waregem. He made his Belgian Pro League debut on 3 August, playing the full 90 minutes in a 2–1 loss at K.S.C. Lokeren Oost-Vlaanderen.

União Madeira
Ferreira returned to his country in the 2015 off-season, joining C.F. União on a three-year deal. His maiden appearance in the Primeira Liga took place on 28 November, when he played one minute in a 2–2 away draw against Vitória de Setúbal.

Sparingly played by manager Luís Norton de Matos in his debut campaign, Ferreira also saw his side be relegated. He asked to be released from contract in May 2017 claiming unpaid wages, which led to criticism from club president Filipe Silva.

Universitatea Craiova
On 21 July 2017, Ferreira joined Romanian club CS Universitatea Craiova. He played his first game in the Liga I nine days later, when he featured 77 minutes in a 1–1 away draw with FC Steaua București.

Ferreira was released by mutual consent on 23 April 2020.

International career
Ferreira earned 84 caps for Portugal at youth level. He appeared in two FIFA World Cup tournaments with the under-20 team, helping them finish second in the 2011 edition in Colombia.

Honours
Universitatea Craiova
Cupa României: 2017–18
Supercupa României runner-up: 2018

Portugal U20
FIFA U-20 World Cup runner-up: 2011

Orders
 Knight of the Order of Prince Henry

References

External links

1993 births
Footballers from Porto
Living people
Portuguese footballers
Portugal youth international footballers
Portugal under-21 international footballers
Association football defenders
Boavista F.C. players
Padroense F.C. players
FC Porto B players
S.V. Zulte Waregem players
C.F. União players
CS Universitatea Craiova players
MTK Budapest FC players
Tractor S.C. players
FK Kukësi players
Liga Portugal 2 players
Primeira Liga players
Belgian Pro League players
Liga I players
Nemzeti Bajnokság I players
Persian Gulf Pro League players
Kategoria Superiore players
Portuguese expatriate footballers
Expatriate footballers in Belgium
Expatriate footballers in Romania
Expatriate footballers in Hungary
Expatriate footballers in Iran
Expatriate footballers in Albania
Portuguese expatriate sportspeople in Belgium
Portuguese expatriate sportspeople in Romania
Portuguese expatriate sportspeople in Hungary
Portuguese expatriate sportspeople in Iran
Portuguese expatriate sportspeople in Albania